The Embassy of Iran, Abu Dhabi is the diplomatic mission representing Iran in the United Arab Emirates. It is located on Al Karama Street in the Diplomatic Area of Abu Dhabi. Mohammad Reza Fayyaz is the current ambassador of Iran to the UAE.

See also

 Consulate-General of Iran, Dubai
 Iran–United Arab Emirates relations
 List of diplomatic missions of Iran
 List of diplomatic missions in the United Arab Emirates

References

External links
 

Iran
Abu Dhabi
Iran–United Arab Emirates relations